The 1991–92 Liga Artzit season saw Beitar Jerusalem and Hapoel Haifa promoted to Liga Leumit. At the other end of the table, Beitar Netanya and Hapoel Tiberias relegated to Liga Alef.

Final table

Promotion-relegation play-offs
14th placed Hapoel Ashdod had to play-off against Liga Alef play-off winners Hapoel Kiryat Shmona:

The result meant that Hapoel Ashdod remained in Liga Artzit.

References
Previous seasons The Israel Football Association 

Liga Artzit seasons
Israel
2